Bugey-Côtière formerly respectively Le Journal de la Côtière and Le Journal du Bugey is a French weekly newspaper, 
dedicated to the news of the Côtière and (part of) Bugey, in Ain in France.

In 2019, Bugey-Côtière is the result of the merge of Le Journal de la Côtière and Le Journal du Bugey. Using the numbering of Le Journal de la Côtière, number 1,200 was reached in July 2019.

Références

External links 
 

Weekly newspapers published in France
Publications established in 2019
2019 establishments in France
Bugey